Vionville is a former commune in the Moselle department in Grand Est in north-eastern France. On 1 January 2019, it was merged into the new commune Rezonville-Vionville.

The battle of Vionville (Rezonville or Mars-la-Tour) was fought here on 16 of August 1870 between the French and the Germans during the Franco-Prussian War.

See also
Communes of the Moselle department
Parc naturel régional de Lorraine

References

Former communes of Moselle (department)
Populated places disestablished in 2019